Stanisław Kunicki (6 June 1861 – 28 January 1886) was a Polish revolutionary.

Kunicki was born into the nobility to a Polish father and a Georgian mother on June 8, 1861. During his student days in St. Petersburgh he joined the Polish St. Petersburg Social Revolutionary Party, which was one of the groups that merged in 1883 to form the Polish First Proletariat party. Kunicki became a member of the new party's central committee.

Kunicki also participated in the People's Will party and advocated for an agreement between it and the First Proletariat.

Kunicki was arrested on June 28, 1884, and was sentenced to death. He was hanged on January 28, 1886, in the Warsaw Citadel.

References

1861 births
1886 deaths
Polish revolutionaries
Executed revolutionaries
Polish people executed by the Russian Empire
Polish people of Georgian descent
Executed Polish people
People executed by the Russian Empire by hanging
Executed people from Georgia (country)
Politicians from Tbilisi